Jarrod McKay (born 8 June 2000) is a New Zealand cricketer. He made his first-class debut on 30 October 2019, for Central Districts in the 2019–20 Plunket Shield season. He made his List A debut on 1 December 2020, for Central Districts in the 2020–21 Ford Trophy. He made his Twenty20 debut on 6 January 2023, for the Otago Volts in the 2022–23 Men's Super Smash.

McKay was educated at Nelson College from 2014 to 2018.

References

External links
 

2000 births
Living people
New Zealand cricketers
Central Districts cricketers
Place of birth missing (living people)
People educated at Nelson College